Common names: eyelash boas.

Trachyboa is a genus of nonvenomous dwarf boas endemic to Central and South America. They are largely terrestrial, fish-eating snakes that inhabit tropical lowlands. Two species are recognized.

Distribution and habitat
Species of Trachyboa are found in Central and South America in Panama, Pacific Colombia, and Ecuador.

Species

T) Type species.

References

Further reading
Boulenger GA (1893). Catalogue of the Snakes in the British Museum (Natural History). Volume I., Containing the Families ... Boidæ ... London: Trustees of the British Museum (Natural History). (Taylor and Francis, printers). xiii + 448 pp. + Plates I-XXVIII. (Genus Trachyboa, p. 109).
Freiberg M (1982). Snakes of South America. Hong Kong: T.F.H. Publications. 189 pp. . (Genus Trachyboa, p. 88).
Goin CJ, Goin OB, Zug GR (1978). Introduction to Herpetology, Third Edition. San Francisco: W.H. Freeman. xi + 378 pp. . (Genus Trachyboa, p. 320).
Peters W (1860). "Eine neue Gattung von Riesenschlangen vor, welche von einem gebornen Preussen, Hrn. Carl Reiss, in Guayaquil nebst mehreren andern werthvollen Naturalien dem zoologischen Museum zugesandt worden ist ". Monatsberichte der Königlichen Preussischen Akademie der Wissenschaften zu Berlin 1860: 200-202. (Trachyboa, new genus, p. 200). (in German).

External links

Tropidophiidae
Taxa named by Wilhelm Peters
Snake genera